Old Barge, Young Love is a 1973 West German comedy romance film directed by Werner Jacobs and starring Roy Black, Barbara Nielsen, and Peter Millowitsch.

Location shooting took place around Schaffhausen in Northern Switzerland.

Cast

References

Bibliography

External links

1973 films
German romantic comedy films
West German films
1970s German-language films
Films directed by Werner Jacobs
1973 romantic comedy films
Seafaring films
Constantin Film films
1970s German films